Igor Vladimirovich Kiselyov (19 August 1979 – 30 December 2014) was a Russian professional footballer.

Club career
He made his professional debut in the Russian Premier League in 1997 for FC Torpedo-Luzhniki Moscow.

Honours
 Russian Cup winner: 2004 (played in the early stages of the 2003/04 tournament for FC Terek Grozny).
 Holds the Russian professional football record for most goals scored in one game. He scored 10 goals in 2001 in a Russian Second Division game, a 16–1 victory for FC Krasnodar-2000 over FC Lokomotiv-Taim Mineralnye Vody.
 Russian Second Division Zone South top scorer: 2001 (47 goals).

Death

On 30 December 2014 Kiselev died suddenly, due to acute heart failure, according to preliminary reports.

References

1979 births
Sportspeople from Krasnodar
2014 deaths
Russian footballers
Association football forwards
FC Torpedo Moscow players
FC Torpedo-2 players
FC Kuban Krasnodar players
FC Akhmat Grozny players
FC Dynamo Stavropol players
FC Vityaz Podolsk players
Russian Premier League players
FC Avangard Kursk players
FC Spartak-UGP Anapa players